Meray Khwab Raiza Raiza is a Hum TV drama which aired from 24 January 2011 to 25 July 2011.

Plot
Meray Khwab Raiza Raiza is the story of an extremely beautiful, well brought-up, but poor girl, Zainab Shah, whose beauty makes her the centre of attraction wherever she goes. Zainab has two friends: Fariha, who belongs to a rich family and who keeps telling her that she is meant to marry a rich man; and Amina, a contented girl who is always trying to show Zainab the reality. Fariha marries her rich cousin Faisal and moves to London. Zainab starts dreaming of a similar marriage but fate brings into her life Ahsan Ayaz, who loves her but who is not rich. Although she marries him, his ordinary job and their ordinary lifestyle depress Zainab.

When Zainab gets pregnant, she forces Ahsan to move out of their current place and rent a better home in some posh area. Ahsan reluctantly agrees and they move in an annex of a posh house. The house is rented to a beautiful single woman, Rimla (Javeria Abbasi). Otherwise lonely Rimla is visited only by her cousin brother, Mir Sikandar Ali (Noman Masood) and her socialite friends. Zainab takes a fancy to Rimla's life style, often trying to compete with her.

Mir Sikandar Ali (Noman Masood) is a wealthy industrialist. He pretends to be Rimla's cousin but he has kept Rimla as his girlfriend. Rimla is madly in love with Sikandar but Sikandar only uses her to spend time and to bring business to him via her beauty. Sikandar observes Zainab at Rimla's house and starts interacting with her. Zainab is hugely impressed by Sikandar's personality and money and she accepts her favors and gifts, causing a rift between Ahsan and Zainab. During one such rift between the couple, Zainab is so angry that she refuses to tell Ahsan of her labor pains, resulting in still birth.

Ahsan is shattered and he wants to take zainab back to their old house, as he considered the house-owners as his family. Zainab disagrees and finds solace in Rimla and Sikandar. Ahsan lets it be, taking care of Zainab's emotional stress of child loss. Sikandar uses the opportunity to emotionally manipulate Zainab further.

Soon, Ahsan has to go out of town for his work. On his way, he has a terrible accident, losing his legs permanently. Not only does he become disabled, he loses his job too, leading towards a financial crises. Sikandar offers Zainab to take divorce from Ahsan and elope with him, which she agrees to without a second thought. She tells Ahsan everything and asks for divorce. Ahsan is heartbroken and leaves in the night unannounced, divorcing her and leaving his everything with Zainab. Sikandar leaves Rimla, marries Zainab and brings her into a huge mansion. Zainab wants to start a family with Sikandar asap but little does she know that Sikandar only intends to keep her as an arm candy and offering to business partners as an escort. Sikandar's wife and children also arrive at the mansion to diss Zainab. Later, Sikandar takes Zainab along to his business meetings in revealing outfits, making zainab uncomfortable. Zainab reminisces her peaceful life with Ahsan. She fights with Sikandar over such issues but Sikandar beats and abuses her, forcefully sending her to spend time with different men. Zainab falls ill due to emotional stress.

Over a period of time, Zainab has accepted her fate, until one day she sees Ahsan in a hotel, healthy. Ahsan has become rich and recovered of illness due to efforts and care by Ahsan's second wife, Sofia. She hides herself but Ahsan catches her glimpse with the man she was sent to spend time with, and she succumbs to a heart attack. Determined for an apology and to mend her ways, Zainab burns herself with acid which leaves her ugly and scarred. Sikandar divorces her and throws her away leaving her homeless. She goes back to Ahsan with her battered self. Ahsan, who still loves her despite of her evil doings, forgives her. Ahsan's wife requests him to marry Zainab. But Zainab refuses and goes away to live in her old hovel. Ahsan returns for her and asks her to remarry him just for the sake of marriage and he won't break Sofia's heart and leave his family.

Cast

References

2011 Pakistani television series debuts
2011 Pakistani television series endings
Pakistani drama television series
Urdu-language television shows
Hum Sitaray
Hum TV original programming
A&B Entertainment